A Spectrum of Infinite Scale is a full-length album by Man or Astro-man?, released in 2000. It was released as a CD and a double 10" on clear yellow/red vinyl, on black vinyl, and on additional clear colors.

The band plays an ImageWriter II on the eleventh song, "A Simple Text File."

Critical reception
AllMusic called the album "another very good collection of tight playing and propulsive instrumentals." Exclaim! wrote: "Being one of the only groups to deservedly make it out of the mid-'90s surf revival, these guys continue to add influences and create a new style of their own that all but leaves surf behind." Orlando Weekly wrote that "more than ever, the guitars are telling stories of adventure."

Track listing
 "Pathway to the Infinite"
 "Song of the Two-Mile Linear Particle Accelerator"
 "Preparation Clont"
 "Curious Constructs of Stem-Like Devices Which Now Prepare Themselves to Be Thought of as Fingers"
 "Um Espectro Sem Escala"
 "Many Pieces of Large Fuzzy Mammals Gathered Together at a Rave and Schmoozing with a Brick"
 "Trapezoid"
 "Very Subtle Elevators"
 "Within One Universe There Are Millions"
 "Spectrograph Reading of the Varying Phantom Frequencies of Chronic, Incurable Tinnitus"
 "A Simple Text File"
 "Obligatory Part 2 Song in Which There Is No Presently Existing Part 1, Nor the Plans to Make One"
 "Multi-Variational Stimuli of Sub-Turgid Foci Covering Cross Evaluative Techniques for Cognitive Analysis of Hypersignificant Graph Peaks Following Those Intersubjective Modules Having Biodegradable Seepage"

Japanese release
The Japanese version inserts two exclusive tracks, making "Multi-Variational Stimuli of Sub-Turgid Foci Covering Cross Evaluative Techniques for Cognitive Analysis of Hypersignificant Graph Peaks Following Those Intersubjective Modules Having Biodegradable Seepage" track 15.

 Track 13: "Particles In Acceleration"
 Track 14: "Two Microscopic Creatures Meet, One Devours The Other "

References

Man or Astro-man? albums
Spectrum Of Infinite Scale, A
Touch and Go Records albums